Gene Sullivan (4 May 1903 – 4 September 1969) was  a former Australian rules footballer who played with St Kilda and Footscray in the Victorian Football League (VFL).

Notes

External links 
		

1903 births
1969 deaths
Australian rules footballers from New South Wales
St Kilda Football Club players
Western Bulldogs players